Sangtiennoi Sor.Rungroj was a decorated Thai Muay Thai fighter. A veteran of over 200 fights, he was a Lumpinee Boxing Stadium and Rajadamnern Stadium champion as well as being WMC World Champion, and remained a Muay Thai trainer at his own Tor.Sangtiennoi gym near Bangkok, until his death on May 16, 2021.

Biography and career
Sangtiennoi had his first fight at 13 years of age against his parents' will, and won 100 baht. He moved to Lukmingkwan gym to start his career in Bangkok, where he took the name Sangtiennoi Sitsurapong.

Sangtiennoi was one of the most popular Muay Thai fighters of his era, receiving purses of over 200,000 baht. His aggressive fighting style made him a fan favorite and saw him fighting for the King's Birthday events against famous international competitors including Dany Bill and Ramon Dekkers.

Sangtiennoi was also a primary training partner and Thai-based teacher of successful Australian Muay Thai fighter John Wayne Parr.

During his fight with Yucel Fidan in 1999 Sangtiennoi, dislocated his shoulder. The injury would continue to hinder him, and he was forced to retire in 2000 when his shoulder was damaged against Takashi Ito in Japan.

During the recovery from injuries, Sangtiennoi opened a gym in his native Pathum Thani.

On May 16, 2021, Sangtiennoi took his own life with a gun, at the age of 54.

Titles & honours

 1998 WMC World -65kg Champion
 1997 Lumpinee Stadium 135 lbs Champion
 1989 Rajadamnern Stadium 130 lbs Champion

Fight record

|-  style="background:#fbb;"
| 2000-03-20|| Loss ||align=left| Takashi Ito || MAJKF "Combat 2000" || Tokyo, Japan || TKO (Shoulder dislocation) || 5 || 2:28 
|-
! style=background:white colspan=9 |
|-  style="background:#c5d2ea;"
| 1999 || Draw||align=left| Samkor Kiatmontep || Lumpinee Stadium || Bangkok, Thailand || Decision  || 5 || 3:00
|-  style="background:#fbb;"
| 1999-03-12|| Loss ||align=left| Yucel Fidan || Impact, Muang Thong Thani || Pak Kret District, Thailand || TKO (Shoulder dislocation) || 4 ||
|-  bgcolor="#fbb"
| 1998-12-05 || Loss||align=left| Dany Bill || King's Birthday Event || Bangkok, Thailand || Decision (Unanimous) || 5 || 3:00
|-  style="background:#f7f6a8;"
| 1998-11-14|| Ex ||align=left| Hiromu Yoshitaka || Shootboxing GROUND ZERO TOKYO ||  Tokyo, Japan || Exhibition || 3 || 3:00
|-  style="background:#cfc;"
| 1998-10-31 || Win||align=left| Kaoponglek Luksuratham || Lumpinee Stadium || Bangkok, Thailand || Decision  || 5 || 3:00
|-  style="background:#cfc;"
| 1998-08-09 || Win ||align=left| Marcus Mangan || Thailand vs Australia || Australia || Decision (Unanimous) || 5 || 3:00
|-
! style=background:white colspan=9 |
|-  style="background:#cfc;"
| 1998 || Win||align=left| Nuengtrakarn Por Muang Ubon || Lumpinee Stadium || Bangkok, Thailand || Decision  || 5 || 3:00
|-  style="background:#fbb;"
|  || Loss||align=left| Samkor Kiatmontep || Lumpinee Stadium || Bangkok, Thailand || Decision  || 5 || 3:00
|-
! style=background:white colspan=9 |
|-  bgcolor="#cfc"
| 1998-02-14 || Win||align=left| Prabpramlek Sitnarong || Lumpinee Stadium || Bangkok, Thailand || Decision  || 5 || 3:00
|-
! style=background:white colspan=9 |
|-  bgcolor="#cfc"
| 1997-12-05 || Win||align=left| Hassan Kassrioui || King's Birthday Event || Bangkok, Thailand || Decision || 5 || 3:00
|-  style="background:#cfc;"
| 1997-09-27 || Win||align=left| Keng Singnakonkuay || Lumpinee Stadium || Bangkok, Thailand || Decision  || 5 || 3:00
|-
! style=background:white colspan=9 |
|-  style="background:#fbb;"
| 1997-04-20 || Loss ||align=left| Ramon Dekkers || The Night of No Mercy || Amsterdam, Netherlands || Decision (Unanimous) || 5 || 3:00

|-  style="background:#c5d2ea;"
| 1996-10-11 || Draw||align=left| Orono Por Muang Ubon || Lumpinee Stadium || Bangkok, Thailand || Decision  || 5 || 3:00
|-
! style=background:white colspan=9 |
|-  style="background:#fbb;"
| 1996-09-21 || Loss ||align=left| Sakmongkol Sithchuchok || Beer Chang Tournament, Semi Final || Bangkok, Thailand || Decision (Unanimous) || 5 || 3:00
|-  style="background:#fbb;"
| 1996-07-13 || Loss ||align=left| Wallop Sor.Sartpat || Lumpinee Stadium || Bangkok, Thailand || Decision  || 5 || 3:00
|-  style="background:#cfc;"
| 1996-05-03 || Win ||align=left| Pairot Wor.Wolapon || Lumpinee Stadium || Bangkok, Thailand  ||  ||  ||

|-  style="background:#cfc;"
| 1996-01-19 || Win ||align=left| Jongsanan Fairtex || Fairtex, Lumpinee Stadium || Bangkok, Thailand  || Decision || 5 || 3:00
|-  style="background:#cfc;"
| 1995-12-30 || Win ||align=left| Pairot Wor.Wolapon || Lumpinee Stadium || Bangkok, Thailand  ||  ||  ||
|-  bgcolor="#cfc"
| 1995-12-05 || Win ||align=left| Dany Bill || King's Birthday Event || Bangkok, Thailand || Decision || 5 || 3:00
|-  style="background:#fbb;"
| 1995-11-03 || Loss ||align=left| Pairot Wor.Wolapon || Lumpinee Stadium || Bangkok, Thailand  || Decision  || 5 || 3:00
|-  style="background:#cfc;"
| 1995-11-22 || Win ||align=left| Angkarndej Por.Paoin || Rajadamnern Stadium || Bangkok, Thailand  || Decision  || 5 || 3:00

|-  style="background:#fbb;"
| 1995-09-29 || Loss||align=left| Jongsanan Fairtex || Lumpinee Stadium || Bangkok, Thailand  || Decision || 5 || 3:00
|-  style="background:#cfc;"
| 1995-09-05 || Win ||align=left| Pairot Wor.Wolapon || Lumpinee Stadium || Bangkok, Thailand  || Decision  ||5  || 3:00
|-  style="background:#c5d2ea;"
| 1995-08-18 || Draw||align=left| Jongsanan Fairtex || Lumpinee Stadium || Bangkok, Thailand  || Decision || 5 || 3:00
|-  style="background:#cfc;"
| 1995-06-30|| Win||align=left| Kongnapa BM Service || Lumpinee Stadium || Bangkok, Thailand || Decision || 5 || 3:00

|-  style="background:#cfc;"
| 1995-|| Win||align=left| Chandet Sor Prantalay || Lumpinee Stadium || Bangkok, Thailand || Decision || 5 || 3:00
|-  style="background:#fbb;"
| 1995-02-04|| Loss ||align=left| Sakmongkol Sithchuchok || Lumpinee Stadium || Bangkok, Thailand || Decision || 5 || 3:00
|-  style="background:#fbb;"
| 1994-11-18|| Loss ||align=left| Sakmongkol Sithchuchok || Lumpinee Stadium || Bangkok, Thailand || Decision || 5 || 3:00

|-  style="background:#cfc;"
| 1994-10-10|| Win||align=left| Nuathoranee Thongracha || Lumpinee Stadium || Bangkok, Thailand || Decision || 5 || 3:00

|-  style="background:#fbb;"
| 1994-07-02|| Loss ||align=left| Orono Por Muang Ubon || Lumpinee Stadium  || Bangkok, Thailand || TKO (Shoulder dislocation) || 3 ||
|-  style="background:#fbb;"
| 1994-03-25|| Loss ||align=left| Chandet Sor Prantalay|| Lumpinee Stadium  || Bangkok, Thailand || Decision || 5 || 3:00
|-
! colspan="8" style="background:white" |
|-  style="background:#fbb;"
| 1994- || Loss ||align=left| Chandet Sor Prantalay|| Lumpinee Stadium  || Bangkok, Thailand || TKO (Doctor Stoppage)|| 4 ||
|-  style="background:#fbb;"
| 1993-11-27|| Loss||align=left| Chanchai Sor Tamarangsri || Lumpinee Stadium  || Bangkok, Thailand || Decision || 5 || 3:00
|-  style="background:#cfc;"
| 1993-10-22|| Win ||align=left| Chanchai Sor Tamarangsri || Lumpinee Stadium  || Bangkok, Thailand || Decision || 5 || 3:00
|-  style="background:#cfc;"
| 1993-09-17|| Win ||align=left| Klasuk Tor.Witthaya|| Lumpinee Stadium || Bangkok, Thailand || Decision || 5 || 3:00
|-  style="background:#cfc;"
| 1993-08-31|| Win ||align=left| Orono Por Muang Ubon || Lumpinee Stadium || Bangkok, Thailand || Decision || 5 || 3:00
|-  style="background:#fbb;"
| 1993-07-27|| Loss||align=left| Orono Por Muang Ubon || Lumpinee Stadium || Bangkok, Thailand || Decision || 5 || 3:00
|-  style="background:#fbb;"
| 1992-12-24|| Loss ||align=left| Chandet Sor Prantalay|| Lumpinee Stadium  || Bangkok, Thailand || Decision || 5 || 3:00
|-  style="background:#fbb;"
| 1992-11-13|| Loss||align=left| Chanchai Sor Tamarangsri || Lumpinee Stadium  || Bangkok, Thailand || Decision || 5 || 3:00
|-  style="background:#fbb;"
| 1992-10-13|| Loss ||align=left| Panomrunglek Chor Sawat|| Lumpinee Stadium  || Bangkok, Thailand || Decision || 5 || 3:00
|-
! colspan="8" style="background:white" |
|-  style="background:#cfc;"
| 1992-09- || Win||align=left| Sakmongkol Sithchuchok || Lumpinee Stadium  || Bangkok, Thailand || Decision  || 5 || 3:00
|-  style="background:#fbb;"
| 1992-08-14 || Loss ||align=left| Jongsanan Fairtex || Lumpinee Stadium || Bangkok, Thailand  || Decision || 5 || 3:00
|-  style="background:#cfc;"
| 1992-07-07 || Win ||align=left| Cherry Sor Wanich || Lumpinee Stadium || Bangkok, Thailand  || Decision || 5 || 3:00
|-  style="background:#fbb;"
| 1992-06-13 || Loss ||align=left| Petdam Lookborai || Lumpinee Stadium || Bangkok, Thailand  || Decision || 5 || 3:00
|-  style="background:#fbb;"
| 1992-05-01 || Loss ||align=left| Petdam Lookborai || Lumpinee Stadium || Bangkok, Thailand  || Decision || 5 || 3:00
|-  style="background:#fbb;"
| 1992-03-20 || Loss ||align=left| Therdkiat Sitthepitak || Lumpinee Stadium || Bangkok, Thailand || Decision || 5 || 3:00
|-  style="background:#cfc;"
| 1992-01-07 || Win ||align=left| Cherry Sor Wanich || Lumpinee Stadium || Bangkok, Thailand  || Decision || 5 || 3:00
|-  style="background:#cfc;"
| 1991-12-27 || Win ||align=left| Namphon Nongkee Pahuyuth || Lumpinee Stadium || Bangkok, Thailand || Decision || 5 || 3:00

|-  style="background:#cfc;"
| 1991-11-26 || Win ||align=left| Namphon Nongkee Pahuyuth || Lumpinee Stadium || Bangkok, Thailand || Decision || 5 || 3:00
|-  style="background:#fbb;"
| 1991-10-25 || Loss ||align=left| Namkabuan Nongkee Pahuyuth || Lumpinee Stadium || Bangkok, Thailand || Decision || 5 || 3:00
|-
! style=background:white colspan=9 |
|-  style="background:#fbb;"
| 1991-09-24 || Loss ||align=left| Namkabuan Nongkee Pahuyuth || Lumpinee Stadium || Bangkok, Thailand || Decision || 5 || 3:00
|-  style="background:#cfc;"
| 1991-09-03 || Win ||align=left| Ramon Dekkers || Lumpinee Stadium || Bangkok, Thailand || Decision (Unanimous) || 5 || 3:00

|-  style="background:#cfc;"
| 1991-05-31 || Win ||align=left| Nuathoranee Thongracha || Lumpinee Stadium || Bangkok, Thailand || Decision  ||5  ||3:00
|-  style="background:#fbb;"
| 1991-05-10 || Loss ||align=left| Nuathoranee Thongracha || Lumpinee Stadium || Bangkok, Thailand || Decision || 5 || 3:00
|-  style="background:#cfc;"
| 1991-03-22 || Win ||align=left| Ramon Dekkers || MAJKF || Bunkyo, Tokyo, Japan || Decision (Unanimous) || 5 || 3:00
|-  style="background:#cfc;"
| 1991-02-15 || Win ||align=left| Superlek Sorn E-Sarn ||  || Phra Nakhon Si Ayutthaya, Thailand || Decision || 5 || 3:00
|-  style="background:#cfc;"
| 1991-01-04 || Win ||align=left| Cherry Sor Wanich || Lumpinee Stadium || Bangkok, Thailand || KO (Knee to the Head) || 3 ||
|-
! style=background:white colspan=9 |
|-  style="background:#fbb;"
| 1990-11-30|| Loss ||align=left| Chamuakpetch Haphalung || Rajadamnern Stadium || Bangkok, Thailand || Decision || 5 || 3:00
|-  style="background:#fbb;"
| 1990-10-14 || Loss ||align=left| Gilbert Ballantine ||  || Amsterdam, Netherlands || Decision || 5 || 3:00 
|-
! style=background:white colspan=9 |

|-  style="background:#cfc;"
| 1990-08-25|| Win||align=left| Malik || || New Zealand || KO || 2 || 

|-  style="background:#cfc;"
| 1990-06-30|| Win ||align=left| Jack Kiatniwat|| Chiang Mai Stadium || Chiang Mai, Thailand || Decision || 5 || 3:00
|-  style="background:#fbb;"
| 1990-05-30|| Loss ||align=left| Chamuakpetch Haphalung|| Rajadamnern Stadium || Bangkok, Thailand || Decision || 5 || 3:00
|-  style="background:#cfc;"
| 1990-02-01|| Win ||align=left| Kongnapa Watcharawit || Rajadamnern Stadium || Bangkok, Thailand || TKO || 3 ||
|-  style="background:#cfc;"
| 1990-01-04|| Win ||align=left| Nokweed Devy || Rajadamnern Stadium || Bangkok, Thailand || Decision || 5 || 3:00

|-  style="background:#cfc;"
| 1989-12-06|| Win ||align=left| Nokweed Devy || Rajadamnern Stadium || Bangkok, Thailand || Decision || 5 || 3:00
|-  style="background:#fbb;"
| 1989-10-18|| Loss ||align=left| Nokweed Devy || Rajadamnern Stadium || Bangkok, Thailand || Decision || 5 || 3:00
|-  style="background:#cfc;"
| 1989-08-30|| Win||align=left| Sombat Sor.Thanikul || Rajadamnern Stadium || Bangkok, Thailand || Decision || 5 || 3:00
|-  style="background:#cfc;"
| 1989-07-09|| Win ||align=left| Manasak Chor.Rojanachai || Rajadamnern Stadium || Bangkok, Thailand || Decision || 5 || 3:00
|-  style="background:#fbb;"
| 1989-06-05|| Loss ||align=left| Chamuakpetch Haphalung|| Rajadamnern Stadium || Bangkok, Thailand || Decision || 5 || 3:00
|-  style="background:#c5d2ea;"
| 1989-04-24|| Draw ||align=left| Chamuakpetch Haphalung || Rajadamnern Stadium || Bangkok, Thailand || Decision || 5 || 3:00
|-  style="background:#cfc;"
| 1989-02-22|| Win ||align=left| Kongnapa Watcharawit || Rajadamnern Stadium || Bangkok, Thailand || Decision || 5 || 3:00
|-  style="background:#cfc;"
| 1989-01-15|| Win ||align=left| Jack Kiatniwat|| Crocodile Farm || Samut Prakan, Thailand || Decision || 5 || 3:00
|-
! style=background:white colspan=9 |
|-  style="background:#fbb;"
| 1988-11-18 || Loss ||align=left| Prasert Kittikasem || Lumpinee Stadium || Bangkok, Thailand || Decision || 5 || 3:00

|-  style="background:#cfc;"
| 1988-10-19 || Win ||align=left| Kongnapa Lukthapfa || Rajadamnern Stadium || Bangkok, Thailand || Decision || 5 || 3:00

|-  style="background:#cfc;"
| 1988-08-25 || Win||align=left| Prasert Kittikasem ||  || Bangkok, Thailand || Decision || 5 || 3:00

|-  style="background:#cfc;"
| 1988-08-05 || Win ||align=left| Thawthong Lukdecha|| Lumpinee Stadium || Bangkok, Thailand || Decision || 5 || 3:00
|-  style="background:#fbb;"
| 1988-06-30 || Loss ||align=left| Wanpadet Phukrongfaa || Rajadamnern Stadium || Bangkok, Thailand || Decision || 5 || 3:00

|-  style="background:#cfc;"
| 1988-05-07 || Win||align=left| Poolsawat Sitsornthong ||  || Bangkok, Thailand || Decision || 5 || 3:00

|-  style="background:#fbb;"
| 1988-03-21 || Loss ||align=left| Prasert Kittikasem || Rajadamnern Stadium || Bangkok, Thailand || Decision || 5 || 3:00

|-  style="background:#cfc;"
| 1987-12-31|| Win||align=left| Nokweed Devy ||  || Bangkok, Thailand || TKO|| 5 || 
|-  style="background:#cfc;"
| 1987-11-26|| Win||align=left| Jongrak Lookprabaht || Rajadamnern Stadium || Bangkok, Thailand || Decision || 5 || 3:00
|-  style="background:#cfc;"
| 1987-10-29|| Win||align=left| Chanchai Sor Tamarangsri || Rajadamnern Stadium || Bangkok, Thailand || Decision || 5 || 3:00
|-  style="background:#cfc;"
| 1987-10-12|| Win ||align=left| Nokweed Devy || Rajadamnern Stadium || Bangkok, Thailand || TKO || 4 ||
|-  style="background:#cfc;"
| 1987-08-24|| Win||align=left| Rungnoi Chomputhong || Rajadamnern Stadium || Bangkok, Thailand || Decision || 5 || 3:00
|-  style="background:#cfc;"
| 1987-04-29|| Win||align=left| Sombat Sor.Thanikul || Rajadamnern Stadium || Bangkok, Thailand || Decision || 5 || 3:00
|-  style="background:#cfc;"
| 1987-03-27|| Win||align=left| Kongdej Chor.Wirach || Rajadamnern Stadium || Bangkok, Thailand || Decision || 5 || 3:00
|-  style="background:#fbb;"
| 1987-02-26|| Loss||align=left| Manasak Sor Ploenchit || Rajadamnern Stadium || Bangkok, Thailand || Decision || 5 || 3:00
|-  style="background:#fbb;"
| 1986-12-22|| Loss||align=left| Sombat Sor.Thanikul || || Bangkok, Thailand || Decision || 5 || 3:00
|-  style="background:#fbb;"
| 1986-11-11|| Loss ||align=left| Chamuakpetch Haphalung || Rajadamnern Stadium || Bangkok, Thailand || Decision || 5 || 3:00
|-  style="background:#cfc;"
| 1986-09-08|| Win||align=left| Jomwo Chernyim || Rajadamnern Stadium || Bangkok, Thailand || Decision || 5 || 3:00

|- style="background:#cfc;"
|1986-08-11
|Win
| align="left" | Singdaeng Kiatthaksin
|
|Bangkok, Thailand
|Decision
|5
|3:00

|-  style="background:#cfc;"
| 1986-05-29|| Win ||align=left| Pornsaknoi Sitchang|| Rajadamnern Stadium || Bangkok, Thailand || Decision || 5 || 3:00

|-  style="background:#cfc;"
| 1986-05-08|| Win||align=left| Saphaphet Kiatphetnoi ||  || Bangkok, Thailand || KO || 2 || 

|- style="background:#fbb;"
|1986-04-04
|Loss
| align="left" | Singdaeng Kiatthaksin
|Lumpinee Stadium
|Bangkok, Thailand
|Decision
|5
|3:00

|- style="background:#fbb;"
|1986-03-17
|Loss
| align="left" | Jampatong Na Nontachai
|Rajadamnern Stadium
|Bangkok, Thailand
|Decision
|5
|3:00

|-  style="background:#fbb;"
| 1986-02-10|| Loss ||align=left| Manasak Sor Ploenchit || Rajadamnern Stadium || Bangkok, Thailand || Decision || 5 || 3:00

|-  style="background:#cfc;"
| 1985-12-26|| Win ||align=left| Saencherng Pinsinchai || Rajadamnern Stadium || Bangkok, Thailand || Decision || 5 || 3:00
|-  style="background:#cfc;"
| 1985-12-02|| Win ||align=left| Pornsaknoi Sitchang|| Rajadamnern Stadium || Bangkok, Thailand || Decision || 5 || 3:00

|- style="background:#fbb;"
|1985-10-24
|Loss
| align="left" | Phanomgkon Hor.Mahachai
|
|Bangkok, Thailand
|Referee Stoppage
|5
|

|- style="background:#cfc;"
|1985-09-09
|Win
| align="left" | Jack Kiatniwat
|Rajadamnern Stadium
|Bangkok, Thailand
|Decision
|5
|3:00

|- style="background:#fbb;"
|1985-08-05
|Loss
| align="left" | Jampatong Na Nontachai
|Rajadamnern Stadium
|Bangkok, Thailand
|KO  (left high kick)
|3
|
|-
! colspan="8" style="background:white" |

|-  style="background:#cfc;"
| 1985-07-01|| Win ||align=left| Nikhom Phetphothong || Rajadamnern Stadium|| Bangkok, Thailand || Decision || 5 || 3:00

|-  style="background:#cfc;"
| 1985-06-12|| Win ||align=left| Roengchai Thairungruang || ||  Thailand || Decision || 5 || 3:00

|-  style="background:#cfc;"
| 1985-04-13|| Win ||align=left| Daradej Kietdaplung ||  || Hat Yai, Thailand || Decision || 5 || 3:00 

|-  style="background:#cfc;"
| 1985-03-27|| Win ||align=left| Chokdee Kiatpayathai || ||  Thailand || Decision || 5 || 3:00

|-  style="background:#cfc;"
| 1985-03-03|| Win ||align=left| Kasemsan Sitloongtong|| ||  Thailand || Decision || 5 || 3:00

|- style="background:#fbb;"
|1985-01-31
|Loss
| align="left" | Jack Kiatniwat
|Rajadamnern Stadium
|Bangkok, Thailand
|Decision
|5
|3:00

|-  style="background:#cfc;"
| 1985-01-12|| Win ||align=left| Boonchai Huasai|| || Songkhla, Thailand || Decision || 5 || 3:00
|-
| colspan=9 | Legend:

References

1966 births
2021 deaths
2021 suicides
Sangtiennoi Sor.Rungroj
Muay Thai trainers
Sangtiennoi Sor.Rungroj
Suicides by firearm in Thailand